Alex Antônio de Melo Santos, or simply Alex (born April 16, 1983), is a Brazilian midfielder. He recently plays for Kamatamare Sanuki in J2 League.

Playing career
In June 2012, Alex joined Tokushima Vortis on loan from Kashima Antlers. The move was later made permanent, with Alex penning a new contract with Tokushima.

Club statistics
Updated to 23 February 2019.

Personal life
His twin brother Alan is also a professional footballer who plays for Fujieda MYFC in the Japan Football League.

References

External links

 

Profile at Kamatamare Sanuki

1983 births
Living people
Brazilian footballers
Brazilian expatriate footballers
Cruzeiro Esporte Clube players
Expatriate footballers in Japan
J1 League players
J2 League players
Kawasaki Frontale players
Avispa Fukuoka players
Kashiwa Reysol players
JEF United Chiba players
Kashima Antlers players
Tokushima Vortis players
Kamatamare Sanuki players
Association football midfielders